The 2013 Franken Challenge was a professional tennis tournament played on clay courts. It was the 26th edition of the tournament which was part of the 2013 ATP Challenger Tour. It took place in Fürth, Germany between 3 and 9 June 2013.

Singles main draw entrants

Seeds

 1 Rankings are as of May 27, 2013.

Other entrants
The following players received wildcards into the singles main draw:
  Andreas Beck
  Peter Heller
  Robin Kern
  Kevin Krawietz

The following player received entry using a protected ranking:
  Laurent Rochette

The following players received entry from the qualifying draw:
  Taro Daniel
  Lorenzo Giustino
  Peter Torebko
  Alexander Ward

Doubles main draw entrants

Seeds

 1 Rankings are as of May 27, 2013.

Other entrants
The following pairs received wildcards into the doubles main draw:
  Andreas Haider-Maurer /  Mario Haider-Maurer
  Kevin Krawietz /  Dominik Schulz
  Gero Kretschmer /  Alexander Satschko

The following pairs received as alternates into the doubles main draw:
  Christian Harrison /  Michael Venus
  Leonardo Kirche /  Aldin Šetkić

Champions

Singles

 João Sousa def.  Wayne Odesnik, 3–6, 6–3, 6–4

Doubles

 Colin Ebelthite /  Rameez Junaid def.  Christian Harrison /  Michael Venus, 6–4, 7–5

External links
Official Website

Franken Challenge
Franken Challenge
Franken Challenge
Franken Challenge